The Floorball League of Canada is the Floorball Canada-sanctioned, elite-level national floorball league that has teams located in Ontario and Quebec.

History
The league began through an International Floorball Federation (IFF) mandate requiring all nations participating in the Floorball World Championships 1st division to have an organized, elite-level national league competing each year. The league was created in fall 2012 in order to assure Canada's participation in the 2014 Men's World Floorball Championships.

Teams
All teams are currently located in Eastern Canada, with the inclusion of Western teams slated for future seasons.

Champions
2018-2019 Ottawa Blizzard

2017-2018 Ottawa Blizzard

2016-2017 Ottawa Blizzard

2015-2016 Ottawa Blizzard

2014-2015 Ottawa Blizzard

2013-2014 Cambridge Floorball Club

Finalist
2015-2016 Club Floorball Montreal

2014-2015 Cambridge FC

2013-2014 Ottawa Blizzard FC

External links
Ottawa Blizzard Floorball Club
Floorball Canada

Floorball in Canada
2013 establishments in Canada
Sports leagues established in 2013